Łukasz Sebastian Zgiep (born July 9, 1988) is a Polish entrepreneur and consultant of the Blockchain-based business models. He is the chief operating officer of the equity crowdfunding platform Beesfund. Doctor of economics at the Warsaw University of Life Sciences (SGGW).

Career 
Zgiep has been an innovation management consultant, improving companies' efficiency of their business processes. He co-authored a report Economics of Cooperation in Poland 2016, and the annual summary The Polish Collaborative Economy Honeycomb, a matrix of companies that use innovative business models. He has been teaching on cooperation economy, business innovation, and crowdfunding.

Since 2018, Zgiep has been the Chief Operating Officer of the Polish equity crowdfunding platform Beesfund. He is a member of the Blockchain and New Technologies Chamber of Commerce, and the Blockchain and New Technologies Chamber of Commerce. He has been mentoring startups in acceleration programs around Poland, and consulting companies on the Blockchain-based sharing economy business models.

Recognition 
In January 2017, Zgiep won a Polish Chamber of Commerce's competition “Digital Poland 2020+”, for the essay Collaborative Economy as an Opportunity for the Polish Economy During the Fourth Industrial Revolution.

Publications

References

External links 
 Łukasz Zgiep's blog

1988 births
Polish business executives
Living people